Norma is a comune (municipality) in the Province of Latina in the Italian region Lazio, located about  southeast of Rome and about  northeast of Latina in the Monti Lepini range.

Its territory houses the Gardens of Ninfa. A summer camp was once held there.

References

External links 
 Official website 
 Folkloric Association of Norma 

Cities and towns in Lazio